Lanton Tower is a 16th-century tower house, about  northwest of Jedburgh, Scottish Borders, Scotland, at Lanton.

History
In 1513 the tower was sacked.  By 1627 is belonged to the Cranstons.  Douglas of Cavers had acquired it by 1627.
It has been altered, with a modern mansion, attached, and restored in 1989.

Structure
The tower is rectangular; it has three storeys, and a garret.  The upper part has been altered, and many windows enlarged.  It had a vaulted basement, with a hatch in the wall.  There are two gun-loops, in the west wall.

Before alteration the tower may have been L-plan.

See also
Castles in Great Britain and Ireland
List of castles in Scotland

References

Castles in the Scottish Borders